Andrew St. John (born July 9, 1982) is an American actor who portrayed Kyle Ratcliffe on ABC's soap opera General Hospital during the 2003 season. Also, he also had a guest-starring role on CBS' CSI: Crime Scene Investigation spinoff CSI: Miami as ill-fated teen Daniel (Danny) Kleiner in 2004 and then again in 2005 on CBS' third primetime spinoff from CSI: Crime Scene Investigation, CSI: NY, as Dalton. He also starred on the short-lived CW drama series Life is Wild. He was born in Millinocket, Maine

Television

Filmography

References

External links
 
 Andrew St. John at General Hospital @ Soap Central

Living people
People from Millinocket, Maine
1982 births
Male actors from Maine